Anna Sergeyevna Tarusina (born 24 January 2003) is a Russian former competitive figure skater. She is the 2018 CS Alpen Trophy champion. On the junior level, she is the 2018 JGP Slovakia and 2018 JGP Slovenia silver medalist.

Personal life 
Tarusina was born on 24 January 2003 in Moscow. She was diagnosed with vision problems shortly after birth. As a child, Tarusina studied at a music school.

Career

Early career 
Tarusina began learning to skate in 2008. Until 2013, she trained in Odintsovo under former coach Sergey Chemodanov.

Tarusina finished 12th at the 2015 Russian Junior Championships and 7th at the 2016 Russian Junior Championships.

Tarusina was supposed to make her ISU Junior Grand Prix of Figure Skating debut in August 2016 at the 2016 JGP St. Gervais, alongside Russian teammate Alina Zagitova. However, she and her coach Sergei Davydov, along with other athletes, were in a car accident on the shuttle bus en route to the rink where the competition was taking place. Tarusina sustained a knee injury requiring surgery and was forced to withdraw from the competition. She missed most of the 2016–17 season because of the accident but placed 10th at the 2017 Russian Junior Championships.

Tarusina finished 12th at the 2018 Russian Championships, which was her first senior national championships.

2018–19 season 
Tarusina made her Junior Grand Prix debut in August 2018 at the first JGP competition of the season in Bratislava, Slovakia. Tarusina placed second behind teammate Anna Shcherbakova and ahead of South Korean competitor You Young with a score of 186.68 points.

At her second assignment, JGP Slovenia, Tarusina placed second in both the short program and the free skate to claim the silver medal behind Russian teammate Anastasia Tarakanova and ahead of South Korean competitor Lee Hae-in. Tarusina set a new ISU personal best in her free skate, earning 122.50 points. Both Tarusina and her teammate Alena Kanysheva won two silver medals during JGP season, but since Kanysheva accumulated more combined total points from her two JGP events than Tarusina did, Kanysheva won the tiebreaker for the final qualification place at the 2018–19 Junior Grand Prix Final. Kanysheva accumulated only about 4 points more than Tarusina. Tarusina was the first alternate for the event.

In mid-November, Tarusina made her senior international debut at the 2018 CS Alpen Trophy, a Challenger Series competition held in Innsbruck, Austria. At the Alpen Trophy, she was ranked first in both the short program and the free skate and won the gold medal by a margin of about 24 points over the silver medalist, her teammate Serafima Sakhanovich. At this event, Tarusina also scored her personal best score of 198.76 points.

At the 2019 Russian Championships, Tarusina placed eighth.

2019–20 season 
Tarusina had knee surgery related to the injury she sustained in the 2016 bus accident prior to the season. After being unable to compete on the Junior Grand Prix due to an extended recovery period, she retired from the sport on 25 September 2019.

Programs

Competitive highlights 
CS: Challenger Series; JGP: Junior Grand Prix

Detailed results

Junior level

References

External links 
 

Russian female single skaters
2003 births
Living people
Figure skaters from Moscow